This is a list of high schools in Orange County, California. It includes public and private schools and is arranged by school district (public schools) or affiliation (private schools).

Public schools

Anaheim Union High School District
Anaheim High School, Anaheim
Cypress High School, Cypress
John F. Kennedy High School, La Palma 
Katella High School, Anaheim
Loara High School, Anaheim
Magnolia High School, Anaheim
Oxford Academy, Cypress
Savanna High School, Anaheim
Western High School, Anaheim

Brea Olinda Unified School District
Brea Olinda High School, Brea

Capistrano Unified School District
Aliso Niguel High School, Aliso Viejo
Capistrano Valley High School, Mission Viejo
Dana Hills High School, Dana Point
San Clemente High School, San Clemente
San Juan Hills High School, San Juan Capistrano
Tesoro High School, Rancho Santa Margarita

Fullerton Joint Union High School District
Buena Park High School, Buena Park
Fullerton Union High School, Fullerton
La Habra High School, La Habra
Sonora High School, La Habra
Sunny Hills High School, Fullerton
Troy High School, Fullerton

Garden Grove Unified School District
Bolsa Grande High School, Garden Grove
Garden Grove High School, Garden Grove
La Quinta High School, Westminster
Los Amigos High School, Fountain Valley
Pacifica High School, Garden Grove
Rancho Alamitos High School, Garden Grove
Santiago High School, Garden Grove

Huntington Beach Union High School District
Edison High School, Huntington Beach
Fountain Valley High School, Fountain Valley
Huntington Beach High School, Huntington Beach
Marina High School, Huntington Beach
Ocean View High School, Huntington Beach
Westminster High School, Westminster

Irvine Unified School District
Irvine High School, Irvine
Northwood High School, Irvine
Portola High School, Irvine
University High School, Irvine
Woodbridge High School, Irvine

Laguna Beach Unified School District
Laguna Beach High School, Laguna Beach

Los Alamitos Unified School District
Los Alamitos High School, Los Alamitos

Newport-Mesa Unified School District
Corona del Mar High School, Newport Beach
Costa Mesa High School, Costa Mesa
Estancia High School, Costa Mesa
Newport Harbor High School, Newport Beach

Orange Unified School District
Canyon High School, Anaheim
El Modena High School, Orange
Orange High School, Orange
Villa Park High School, Villa Park

Placentia-Yorba Linda Unified School District
El Dorado High School, Placentia
Esperanza High School, Anaheim
Valencia High School, Placentia
Yorba Linda High School, Yorba Linda

Saddleback Valley Unified School District
El Toro High School, Lake Forest
Laguna Hills High School, Laguna Hills
Mission Viejo High School, Mission Viejo
Trabuco Hills High School, Mission Viejo

Santa Ana Unified School District
Century High School, Santa Ana
Godinez Fundamental High School, Santa Ana
Saddleback High School, Santa Ana
Santa Ana High School, Santa Ana
Segerstrom Fundamental High School, Santa Ana
Valley High School, Santa Ana
Middle College High School, Santa Ana California

Tustin Unified School District
Arnold O. Beckman High School, Irvine
Foothill High School (Tustin), North Tustin
Tustin High School, Tustin

Alternative/Continuation
Albor Charter School, Santa Ana
Back Bay High School, Costa Mesa
Brea Canyon Alternative High School, Brea
California Preparatory Academy, San Juan Capistrano
Cesar Chavez High School, Santa Ana
Coast High School, Huntington Beach
Creekside High School, Irvine
Early College High School, Costa Mesa
El Camino High School, Placentia
Gilbert High School, Anaheim
Hillview High School (Orange County, California), North Tustin
Junipero Serra High School, San Juan Capistrano
La Entrada High School, Yorba Linda
La Sierra High School, Fullerton
La Vista High School, Fullerton
Lorin Griset Academy, Santa Ana
Marie L. Hare High School, Garden Grove
Middle College High School, Santa Ana
Monte Vista High School, Costa Mesa
Orange County High School of the Arts, Santa Ana
Richland Continuation High School, Orange
Polaris High School, Anaheim
San Joaquin High School, Irvine
Silverado High School, Mission Viejo
Valley Vista High School, Fountain Valley

Private schools

Catholic

Diocesan

Mater Dei High School, Santa Ana
Rosary Academy, Fullerton
Santa Margarita Catholic High School, Rancho Santa Margarita

Independent
Cornelia Connelly High School, Anaheim
Padre Pio Academy, Garden Grove
JSerra Catholic High School, San Juan Capistrano
St. Michael's Preparatory School, Silverado
Servite High School, Anaheim

Protestant
7th Day Adventist
 Orangewood Academy
Non-denominational
Brethren Christian Junior/Senior High School, Huntington Beach
Capistrano Valley Christian Schools, San Juan Capistrano
Calvary Chapel High School, Santa Ana
Crystal Cathedral High School, Garden Grove
Saddleback Valley Christian School, San Juan Capistrano
Spirit Christian Academy, Tustin
Whittier Christian High School, La Habra
Grace OC Academy, Anaheim
Pacifica Christian High School, Newport Beach
Newport Christian School, Newport Beach

Episcopal
St. Margaret's Episcopal School

Lutheran
Crean Lutheran High School, Irvine
Lutheran High School of Orange County, Orange

Jewish
 Hebrew Academy OC
 Tarbut V' Torah Community Day School

Nonsectarian
Acaciawood Preparatory Academy, Anaheim
Alton School, Cypress
Eldorado-Emerson, Orange
Fairmont Preparatory Academy, Anaheim
Florence Crittenton School, Fullerton
Fusion Academy & Learning Center, Huntington Beach
Fusion Academy & Learning Center, Mission Viejo
Halstrom High School, Mission Viejo
Sage Hill School, Newport Beach
Silverleaf Academy, Mission Viejo
The Tesla Academy, Irvine
Waldorf School of Orange County, Costa Mesa

See also
List of high schools in Los Angeles County, California
List of high schools in San Diego County, California
List of high schools in California
List of school districts in Orange County, California
List of closed secondary schools in California

References

External links
 Guide to the Orange County School Yearbook Collection. Special Collections and Archives, The UC Irvine Libraries, Irvine, California.

High schools
Orange County